Grace Hirst ( Bracken, 9 August 1805 – 8 September 1901) was a New Zealand businesswoman, farmer, nurse and midwife. She was born in Midgley, Yorkshire, England on 9 August 1805 as Grace Bracken. She married Thomas Hirst on 22 June 1829 at Halifax, West Yorkshire.

References

1805 births
1901 deaths
New Zealand farmers
New Zealand women farmers
New Zealand women in business
New Zealand nurses
New Zealand midwives
People from Calderdale (district)
English emigrants to New Zealand
19th-century New Zealand businesspeople
19th-century New Zealand businesswomen
New Zealand women nurses